Anne Meara Stiller (September 20, 1929 – May 23, 2015) was an American actress and comedian. Along with her husband Jerry Stiller, she was one-half of the prominent 1960s comedy team Stiller and Meara. Their son is actor, director, and producer Ben Stiller. She was also featured on stage, on television, and in numerous films and later became a playwright. During her career, Meara was nominated for four Emmy Awards and a Tony Award, and she won a Writers Guild Award as a co-writer for the television movie The Other Woman.

Early years
Meara was born on September 20, 1929, in Brooklyn, New York, the daughter of parents of Irish descent, Mary (née Dempsey) and Edward Joseph Meara, a corporate lawyer for American Standard. An only child, she was raised in Rockville Centre, New York, on Long Island. When Anne was 11 years old, her mother died by suicide.

When she was 18, Meara spent a year studying acting at the Dramatic Workshop at The New School and at HB Studio under Uta Hagen in Manhattan. The following year, in 1948, she began her career as an actress  in summer stock.

Career

Comedy team

Meara met actor-comedian Jerry Stiller in 1953, and they married in 1954. Until he suggested it, she had never thought of doing comedy. "Jerry started us being a comedy team," she said. "He always thought I would be a great comedy partner." They joined the Chicago improvisational company The Compass Players (which later became The Second City) and, after leaving, formed the comedy team of Stiller and Meara. In 1961 they were performing in nightclubs in New York and by the following year were considered a "national phenomenon", said the New York Times.

Their often improvised comedy routines brought many relationship foibles to live audiences. Their skits focused on domestic themes, as did Nichols and May, another comedy team from the Chicago Compass Players project during that period. "They were Nichols and May without the acid and with warmth," notes author Lawrence Epstein. They also added a new twist to their comedy act, he adds, by sometimes playing up the fact that Stiller was Jewish and Meara was Catholic. After Nichols and May broke up as a team in 1961, Stiller and Meara were the number-one couple comedy team by the late 1960s. And as Mike Nichols and Elaine May were not married, Stiller and Meara became the most famous married couple comedy team since Burns and Allen.

After some years honing the act, Stiller and Meara became regulars on The Ed Sullivan Show, with 36 appearances, and other TV programs, including The Tonight Show Starring Johnny Carson. They released their first LP in 1963, Presenting America's New Comedy Sensation: Jerry Stiller and Anne Meara Live at The Hungry I, which became a hit. By 1970, however, they broke up their act because it was affecting their marriage: "I didn't know where the act ended and our marriage began," complained Meara in 1977. Stiller agreed, fearing, "I would have lost her as a wife."

Television, stage, film, video
During the 1970s, Meara and Stiller wrote and performed many radio commercials for Blue Nun Wine. She had a recurring role on the sitcom Rhoda as airline stewardess Sally Gallagher, one of the title character's best friends. She also had a small role as Mrs. Curry opposite Laurence Olivier in The Boys from Brazil (1978).

In 1975, she starred in her own series, Kate McShane, on CBS. She was nominated for an Emmy Award for Outstanding Lead Actress in a Drama Series in 1976; however, the show was canceled after ten episodes.

Also, in the 1970s, Meara provided narration for segments of the educational television series Sesame Street consisting of scenes from silent films.

Meara costarred with Carroll O'Connor and Martin Balsam in the early 1980s hit sitcom Archie Bunker's Place, which was a continuation of the influential 1970s sitcom All in the Family. She played the role of Veronica Rooney, the bar's cook, for the show's first three seasons (1979–1982). During that time, she acted in the movie Fame (1980), in which she played English teacher Elizabeth Sherwood. She also appeared as the grandmother in the TV series ALF in the late 1980s. The Stiller and Meara Show, her own 1986 TV sitcom, in which Stiller played the deputy mayor of New York City and Meara portrayed his wife, a television commercial actress, was unsuccessful. From 1999 to 2007, Meara guest starred in The King of Queens (where her husband played Arthur Spooner), first as Mary Finnegan, then as Veronica Olchin (mother of Spence, who was played by Patton Oswalt). Veronica and Arthur were married in the series finale.

Starting in October 2010, Meara and Jerry Stiller began starring in a Yahoo! web series called Stiller & Meara produced by Red Hour Digital, a production company owned by their son Ben Stiller.

She accepted a role in the off-Broadway play Love, Loss, and What I Wore with Conchata Ferrell, AnnaLynne McCord, Minka Kelly, and B. Smith. She taught a technique and scene study class at HB Studio until her death.

Writing and consulting
In 1995, Meara wrote the comedy After-Play, which became an off-Broadway production. In her later years, she portrayed recurring roles on the television shows Sex and the City (as Mary Brady) and The King of Queens (as Veronica Olchin). During the 2004–05 season, she appeared in an episode of Law & Order: Special Victims Unit.

She was the consulting director of J.A.P. – The Jewish American Princesses of Comedy, a 2007 off-Broadway production that featured live stand-up routines by four female Jewish comics juxtaposed with the stories of legendary performers from the 1950s and 1960s: Totie Fields, Jean Carroll, Pearl Williams, Betty Walker, and Belle Barth.

In 2009, Meara wrote her personal life reflections in a New York-focused online blog titled Mr. Beller's Neighborhood -- New York City Stories. In it, Meara recalled her mother's death and her childhood experiences at Catholic boarding school.

Personal life

Religion
Meara was born, baptized, and raised a Roman Catholic. She converted to Judaism six years after marrying Stiller. She insisted that she did not convert at Stiller's request, explaining, "Catholicism was dead to me". She took her conversion seriously and studied the Jewish faith in such depth that her Jewish-born husband quipped, "Being married to Anne has made me more Jewish". They discussed how they met and their early career during a guest appearance on the TV game show What's My Line? in 1968.

Children
Meara and her husband had two children, Amy and Ben.

Death
Meara died on May 23, 2015, at her home in Manhattan at the age of 85, having suffered multiple strokes.

Filmography

Film
Sources: TCM; AllMovie;

Television

Theatre

Radio 
I'd Rather Eat Pants, National Public Radio, 2002

Awards and nominations 

 On February 9, 2007, Meara and Jerry Stiller received stars on the Hollywood Walk of Fame at 7018 Hollywood Blvd.

References

External links 

 Stiller & Meara Yahoo podcast
 
 
 
 
 
 Production: Anna Christie – Working in the Theatre Seminar video at American Theatre Wing.org, January 1993
 
 Anne Meara at the Comedy Hall of Fame

1929 births
2015 deaths
20th-century American comedians
21st-century American comedians
20th-century American actresses
21st-century American actresses
Actresses from New York City
American film actresses
American people of Irish descent
American Reform Jews
American television actresses
American women comedians
Converts to Judaism from Roman Catholicism
Converts to Reform Judaism
Jewish American actresses
Jewish American dramatists and playwrights
American stage actresses
American women dramatists and playwrights
20th-century American dramatists and playwrights
Writers from Brooklyn
20th-century American women writers
Comedians from New York City
Jewish American female comedians
People from Rockville Centre, New York
21st-century American Jews